Clathrina sulphurea is an unaccepted scientific name and may refer to three species of calcareous sponge:
 Arturia canariensis, found in the Canary Islands, Cape Verde, the Adriatic Sea and the Caribbean Sea
 Clathrina clathrus, found in the Mediterranean and on Atlantic coasts of Europe
 Clathrina coriacea, found along the eastern Atlantic coasts